Gervase Parker Bushe (1744 – 13 August 1793) was an Irish landowner and MP.

He was the son of Amyas Bushe of Dublin and his wife Elizabeth Parker. He was educated at Christ Church, Oxford (where he matriculated in 1763) and at Trinity College Dublin (where he graduated BA, LLB and LLD). He became a lawyer and lived at Kilfane in County Kilkenny.

He served as an MP in the Parliament of Ireland for Granard from 1767 to 1776, for Kilkenny City from 1778 to 1783, for Fore from 1783 to 1790 and for Lanesborough from 1790 to 1793. He was appointed High Sheriff of County Kilkenny for 1768-69.

He was a member of the Royal Irish Academy. In a paper presented to the Academy in 1789 he calculated the population of Ireland as approximately 4 million.

He died in August 1793 at Kilfane. He had married Mary Grattan, the daughter of James Grattan, the Recorder of Dublin and MP for Dublin City and the sister of Henry Grattan, the anti-union MP. They had 10 children.

References

1744 births
1793 deaths
Alumni of Christ Church, Oxford
18th-century Anglo-Irish people
18th-century Irish lawyers
Irish MPs 1761–1768
Irish MPs 1769–1776
Irish MPs 1776–1783
Irish MPs 1783–1790
Irish MPs 1790–1797
High Sheriffs of County Kilkenny
Members of the Parliament of Ireland (pre-1801) for County Kilkenny constituencies
Members of the Parliament of Ireland (pre-1801) for County Westmeath constituencies
Members of the Parliament of Ireland (pre-1801) for County Longford constituencies
Members of the Royal Irish Academy